Mit Oswald in der Oper is an East German film. It was released in 1956.

External links
 

1956 films
East German films
1950s German-language films
Films directed by Gottfried Kolditz
1950s German films